The 1922 Labour Party leadership election was the first leadership election for the posts of chairman and leader of the Parliamentary Labour Party. Previously the position had been simply the "Chairman of the Parliamentary Labour Party".

The election took place when the incumbent chairman J. R. Clynes was challenged by the former leader Ramsay MacDonald. MacDonald opposed the way Clynes led the party.

Candidates 

 John Clynes, incumbent leader of the Labour Party, Member of Parliament (MP) for Manchester Platting
 Ramsay MacDonald, former leader of the Labour Party, MP for Aberavon

Result
Ramsay MacDonald was elected in a single ballot of Labour MPs on 14 December.

Aftermath 
After the election Clynes was given the newly created office of deputy leader of the Labour Party. As Labour leader, MacDonald became prime minister in 1924 and from 1929 to 1931, at which point he became head of a National Government that was opposed by the bulk of the Labour Party. He was succeeded as party leader by Arthur Henderson. MacDonald was subsequently expelled from the party. In 1932, George Lansbury became leader unopposed, as one of the few experienced Labour MPs left in Parliament, but trades union opposition to his pacifism led to his resignation in 1935 and replacement by his deputy Clement Attlee. A month later Attlee was challenged in a new election.

References
 

1922
1922 elections in the United Kingdom
Ramsay MacDonald
Labour Party leadership election (UK)